The Audubon Park neighborhood is located in the Northeast community in Minneapolis. Audubon Park is one of ten neighborhoods in Ward 1 of Minneapolis, which is represented on the Minneapolis City Council by Councilmember Elliot Payne. The neighborhood is bounded by Saint Anthony Parkway to the north, NE Stinson Parkway to the east, NE Lowry Avenue to the south, and Central Avenue to the west. Stinson Parkway and St. Anthony Parkway are both part of the Grand Rounds National Scenic Byway. Stinson Parkway is also the city's border with St. Anthony. 

Audubon Park is also the name of the only city park located entirely within the boundaries of the Audubon Park neighborhood. The park and neighborhood are named in honor of John James Audubon, a great American naturalist and ornithologist. A majority of the houses in this relatively hilly neighborhood were built in the 1940s.

References

External links
Minneapolis Neighborhood Profile - Audubon Park
Audubon Neighborhood Association

Neighborhoods in Minneapolis